Crosses is an unincorporated community in Valley Township, Madison County, Arkansas, United States, located at the intersection of Arkansas Highways 16 and Highway 295.

History
The community has the name of one Mr. Cross, a pioneer citizen.

In 2012, Arkansas head football coach Bobby Petrino was involved in a motorcycle crash while sliding off Highway 16 near Crosses, his passenger being former Arkansas All-SEC volleyball player Jessica Dorrell. He was subsequently fired from his coaching job for lying about the accident to the school.

References

Unincorporated communities in Madison County, Arkansas
Unincorporated communities in Arkansas